Waardhuizen is a village in the municipality of Altena, in the province of North Brabant, Netherlands. It is about 4 km (2.5 mi) south of Woudrichem, as well as just south of Uitwijk. As of 2020, Waardhuizen had a population of 275.

History
Waardhuizen was first mentioned in 1292 under the name "Werthuysen". It was a part of the municipality of Emmikhoven en Waardhuizen (also called Emmikhoven c.a. or just Emmikhoven), alongside the other namesake, Emmikhoven.

Emmikhoven en Waardhuizen merged into the municipality of Almkerk in 1879, the latter merged into the municipality of Woudrichem in 1973, which in turn merged into the municipality of Altena in 2019.

Geography 
Waardhuizen lies south of the Oude Alm stream, not far from the provincial border with South Holland and Utrecht. The hamlet of Stenenheul belongs to Waardhuizen.

Notable people 
 Louwrens Penning (1854–1927), writer
 Carola Schouten (born 1977), Minister of Agriculture
 Raymond Schouten (born 1985), motorcycle racer

References

External links 
  Emmikhoven en Waardhuizen, Brabants Historisch Informatie Centrum

Populated places in North Brabant
Geography of Altena, North Brabant